Mitochondrially encoded tRNA glutamine also known as MT-TQ is a transfer RNA which in humans is encoded by the mitochondrial MT-TQ gene.

MT-TQ is a small 72 nucleotide RNA (human mitochondrial map position 4329-4400) that transfers the amino acid glutamine to a growing polypeptide chain at the ribosome site of protein synthesis during translation.

References